Xu Xi is the name of:

Xu Xi (painter) (died before 976), Southern Tang painter
Xu Xi (writer) (born 1954), Hong Kong writer